KLRU (channel 18), branded on-air as Austin PBS, is a PBS member television station in Austin, Texas, United States, owned by the Capital of Texas Public Telecommunications Council. In 2022, KLRU moved into its "Austin Media Center" studios located on the Austin Community College Highland Campus, which was redeveloped from the former Highland Mall. KLRU occupies  in what was previously the mall's Dillard's department store. The station's transmitter is located in the West Austin Antenna Farm in unincorporated Travis County. In addition to airing program content from PBS, it produces original programming including the national music series Austin City Limits.

History

When KLRN in San Antonio was built, it was designed to serve both San Antonio and Austin, as there was interest in building a public television station in Austin but not enough funding until the University of Texas got involved. It had studios in both cities (in Austin, at the Jesse H. Jones Communications Center on the University of Texas at Austin campus). Its transmitter was located at New Braunfels, providing enough signal to provide coverage to San Antonio and Austin, but this arrangement proved insufficient to cover all of Travis and Williamson counties, and reception in Austin had been poorer than expected due to intervening hilly terrain. The Southwest Texas Public Broadcasting Council, owner of KLRN, filed to build a new television station on Austin's non-commercial reserved channel 18 in 1975 and received a construction permit on September 3, 1976.

In 1978, KLRN began a public fundraising drive to raise the money to build KLRU. Its construction enabled 23 additional school districts to benefit from the station's educational programming. The transmitter was activated on April 24, 1979, and programs began May 4. Born at a time when its ownership was embroiled in other controversies involving operations, the station's first license was only for one year due to misrepresentations over matching donations during the fund drive.

From the moment KLRU signed on, a future where KLRN and KLRU were separate entities was in the offing. Only a year after KLRU hit the airwaves, it received its own Austin-based governing board, though it continued under the ownership of the Southwest Texas Public Broadcasting Council. In 1984, KLRN moved to a new tower in San Antonio. Two years later, for financial reasons, officials began exploring an outright split of the two stations, which was approved in September 1986, with separate branding for both stations instituted on October 1, 1986. In 1987, the two stations officially went their separate ways, with KLRU coming under the ownership of the Capital of Texas Public Broadcasting Council.

In addition to the Austin market, KLRU claims Bell and Falls counties, which are in the Waco–Temple–Bryan market, as part of its primary coverage area. It became the default PBS member station for the western half of the Waco market via cable after KNCT ended its membership with PBS on August 31, 2018.

On November 4, 2019, the station rebranded as Austin PBS with a new logo, to coincide with PBS' rebranding the same day and the 50th anniversary of the parent network.

Programming

Programs produced by KLRU
 Arts In Context – Documentary series focusing on creativity and the arts. klru.org/artsincontext
 Austin City Limits – A long-running PBS music program that helped establish Austin as the "Live Music Capital of the World."
 Austin Now – A weekly series that examines people, ideas, and issues that define Austin. (not currently in production)
 Austin Revealed – An oral history project sharing the stories of Austin's past and present to encourage discussion and thought around the city's future. 
 BBQ with Franklin – Cooking tips from Aaron Franklin. 
 Blackademics TV –Top Black Studies scholars engage with projects and research focused on education, performance and youth empowerment.
 Central Texas Gardener – A natural gardening program hosted by Tom Spencer.
 Civic Summit – KLRU's program for discourse on public affairs. klru.org/civicsummit
 Docubloggers – A high-tech look at the life of Austin. (no longer in production)
 In Context – A series on design, architecture, and art. (no longer in production,  became Arts In Context)
 The Intergalactic Nemesis –  A 17-part live-action graphic novel- a mash-up of a radio play and comic book. 
 Juneteenth Jamboree – Celebrate the history and rich culture of African Americans in Central Texas. klru.org/juneteenth
 Overheard – A weekly interview series, formerly known as Texas Monthly Talks; it is hosted by Texas Tribune editor Evan Smith. klru.org/overheard
 Painted Churches of Texas – Documentary on the painted churches located in Central Texas.
 Special Session – Seen while the Texas State Legislature is in session, it is a magazine show that looks at issues that are important to Texans; it is hosted by Paul Stekler. (not currently in production)
 SXSW Presents – A feature and short film series presented by the SXSW Film Festival in association with the Austin Chronicle weekly newspaper.
 What's That, Buzz? – A 12-part web series that explores the world of sound effects and Foley. Learn how sounds effects are made and how professionals in the field do their job.

Programs produced in Austin and presented by KLRU
 The Biscuit Brothers – A television series about country music for children.
 The Daytripper – KLRU is the presenting station of the program, which is produced by Hogaboom Road, Inc., highlighting travel destinations across Texas; it is hosted by Chet Garner.
 Downtown – A weekly series spotlighting the people, places, and things associated with downtown Austin and how it differs from other cities' downtown areas. (no longer in production)
 Hardly Sound – Hardly Sound is a documentary TV series focusing on Texas underground music and artists - showcasing their stories, the creative process, and sharing a dialogue within the creative community.
 The Forgotten Americans – A 2000 documentary produced by Galán Productions for PBS
 One Square Mile: Texas – Produced by filmmakers Carl and Elisabeth Crum. One Square Mile: Texas is a documentary television series that depicts Texas culture from the perspective of distinct square miles across the Lone Star state. The series is a microcosm of Texas life and a collective portrait of the state. The series represents the many faces and facets of Texas from the perspective of the individual while spanning the emotional, demographic & physical landscapes.

Technical information

Subchannels
The station's digital signal is multiplexed:

Analog-to-digital conversion
KLRU shut down its analog signal on April 16, 2009. Before shutting down the signal forever, it played its nightly sign-off from the 70's one last time. The station's digital signal remained on its pre-transition UHF channel 22, using PSIP to display KLRU's virtual channel as 18 on digital television receivers.

References

External links
Official website

PBS member stations
Television channels and stations established in 1979
LRU
Austin City Limits
1979 establishments in Texas